Run On is a South Korean television series starring Im Si-wan, Shin Se-kyung, Choi Soo-young, and Kang Tae-oh. It aired on JTBC from December 16, 2020, to February 4, 2021, and is available for streaming worldwide on Netflix.

Synopsis
Run On tells the love story of Ki Seon-gyeom, a former sprinter who is working to become a sports agent, and Oh Mi-joo, a subtitle translator.

Cast

Main
 Im Si-wan as Ki Seon-gyeom.  Innocent but caring, Seon-gyeom was a national Track and Field athlete who always got second place. Seon-gyeom's parents were both very busy and his only sibling was not a companion. As a result, he grew up largely without social interaction. Oh Mi-joo is his first real friend. Despite his lonely existence, he grew up in a privileged environment. He considers the world as friendly.
 Shin Se-kyung as Oh Mi-joo. Oh Mi-joo works as a film translator who loves movies and thinks that every movie has a deep message if you watch it thoroughly. She grew up an orphan. As a result, she had to work very hard in order to get where she is now.  She considers the world exceptionally harsh.
 Choi Soo-young as Seo Dan-ah. Seo Dan-ah is the CEO of Dann Agency. She is a very busy woman and very passionate about what she's doing. Grew up in a family that lacks love, she doesn't know how to express her feelings in the right way so she is known to be rude, sarcastic, and very straight-forward for a while until she learns what it means to have friends and true love. She had to give up the love of soccer because of her family's tight rules. She also has a unique taste in arts, paintings especially.
 Kang Tae-oh as Lee Yeong-hwa. Cheerful and childlike, Yeong-hwa is the only person who could crack open Dan-ah's cold heart. He is a college art student who donates his paintings to a nearby cafe. He has his own way of channeling his feelings into his paintings.

Supporting

Ki Seon-gyeom's Family 
 Park Yeong-gyu as Ki Jung-do. A very ambitious man who used his family in his games to raise his presidential candidate ratings.
 Cha Hwa-yeon as Yook Ji-Woo. A very successful actress who is known as "The Queen of Cannes". 
Ryu Sun-young as Ki Eun-bi. South Korea's number one golfer and Ki Seon-gyeom's older sister. She loves her brother dearly and always had his back whenever he had a fight with their father.

Seo Dan-ah's Family 

 Lee Hwang-eui as Seo Myung-pil. Dan-ah’s father and chairman of the Seomyung Group.
 Lee Shin-ki as Seo Myung-min. Dan-ah’s half-brother. He is younger than her but their father registered Dan-ah’s birthday after he was born. 
 Choi Jae-hyun as Seo Tae-woong. Dan-ah’s youngest half-brother. He is in the fictional k-pop group AtoZ. It is implied he wasn’t born in Korea and had to learn Korean.

Track People 

 Lee Jung-ha as Kim Woo-shik. He is assaulted by Park Gyu-deok and Kim Gi-beom.
 Park Sung-joon as Kwon Young-il. Ki Seon-gyeom's senior. 
 Park Sang-won as Park Gyu-deok. Assaulted Kim Woo-shik.
 Na Ji-hoon as Kim Gi-beom. Assaulted Kim Woo-shik.
 Seo Jin-won as head track and field coach

Others 
 Lee Bong-ryun as Park Mae-yi. Oh Mi-joo's roommate who acts like her older sister.
 Kim Dong-young as Go Ye-chan. Yeong-hwa's best friend, works at the cafe.
 Seo Eun-kyung as Dong Kyung. Works at DANN Agency. Ye-chan and Ye-joon's mother. 
 Yeon Je-wook as Jung Ji-hyun. Dan-ah's assistant at DANN Agency and Tae-Woong's former tutor.
 Bae Yoo-ram as Han Seok-won. Mi-joo's ex-boyfriend. He is a film director.
 Seo Jeong-yeon as Coach Bang. Seon-gyeom's former track coach.
 Kim Si-eun as Go Ye-joon. Ye-chan's younger sister. She likes boxing and is tutored by Yeong-hwa.

Special appearances  
 Park Joo-hee as Producer Hui-jin (Ep. 5-7-9 & 16)
 Lee Do-yeop as an athletic committee member (Ep. 6)
 Kim Won-hae as bartender (Ep. 8 & 16)
 Kim Seon-ho as Kim Sang-ho (Ep. 16)

Production
Production was halted several times due to the COVID-19 pandemic.

Original soundtrack

Part 1

Part 2

Part 3

Part 4

Part 5

Part 6

Part 7

Part 8

Part 9

Part 10

Part 11

Part 12

Viewership

References

External links
  
 
 

JTBC television dramas
2020 South Korean television series debuts
2021 South Korean television series endings
South Korean romance television series
South Korean sports television series
Television productions suspended due to the COVID-19 pandemic
Television series by Zium Content
Korean-language Netflix exclusive international distribution programming